Sheel Kant Sharma was the ninth Secretary General of the South Asian Association for Regional Cooperation (SAARC), serving from 2008 to 2011. He is an expert on energy, and was formerly Indian envoy to Austria.

Academic background
Master of Science (Nuclear Physics) from Indian Institute of Technology (IIT), Mumbai (1971).
Ph.D. (High Energy Physics) from Indian Institute of 	Technology (IIT), Mumbai (1974).

Professional Background:

Publications
Research articles co-authored in Physical Review-D 	(1971), Physical Review Letters (1972) 
	Articles in newspapers and periodicals (Times of India, Mainstream and Sunday) during 1981-82 on 	nuclear disarmament issues 
	As Member of the UN Study Group on Verification 	(1989–91) co-authored the UN Report on 	Verification in 1991
	As Member of the UN Study Group on Defensive 	Security Concepts (1991–93), co-authored the UN 	Report on Defensive Security Concepts 
	Wrote a UNIDIR Monograph on Verification of 	Fissile Materials Cut-Off and Non-use of Nuclear 	Weapons (1992)
	Article in the IAEA Bulletin - 1995
	Paper presented at the Pugwash Conference on 	Energy in Malta (1995) 
	Co-authored UN panel's report on missile in all their 		aspects in 2002 
	
Conferences attended as representative of India/delegate:	
	Non-Aligned Summit, New Delhi (1983)
	Kuala Lumpur (2003), Annual Six Nation Summits on Nuclear Disarmament (1985–89)
	Conference on Disarmament (1983–86)
	United Nations General Assembly (1983–86, 2000-	2003) 
	U.N. Disarmament Commission (1984–86, 2001)
	UN Conference Rio+5 (1997)
	IAEA General Conference (1994–99) and since 2004
	International Conferences on Nuclear and Energy 	Issues (1994–99) 
	ARF Ministerial Meetings (2000–04) 
	
Languages:	French and Arabic

References

Former Indian envoy Sheel kant Sharma takes over as new SAARC chief | TopNews -
 -

Secretaries General of the South Asian Association for Regional Cooperation
Living people
IIT Bombay alumni
International Atomic Energy Agency officials
Ambassadors of India to Austria
Permanent Representatives of India to the United Nations
Year of birth missing (living people)